Following is a list of senators of French West Africa, people who represented the colonies in French West Africa in the Senate of France during the French Fourth Republic (1945–1959). All of these colonies became independent countries between 1958 and 1960.

Dahomey

Senators for Dahomey (now Benin) under the French Fourth Republic were:

France granted autonomy to the Republic of Dahomey in 1958 and full independence on 1 August 1960.

Guinea

Senators for French Guinea under the French Fourth Republic were:

On 2 October 1958 Guinea proclaimed itself a sovereign and independent republic with Ahmed Sékou Touré as president.

Ivory Coast

Senators for the Ivory Coast under the French Fourth Republic were:

In 1958 Ivory Coast became an autonomous member of the French Community and in 1960 the country became independent.

Mauritania

Senators for Mauritania under the French Fourth Republic were:

Mauritania became an independent nation in November 1960.

Niger

Senators for Niger under the French Fourth Republic were:

Niger became an autonomous state within the French Community  on 4 December 1958. 
The country acquired full independence on 3 August 1960.

Senegal

Senators for Senegal under the French Fourth Republic were:

On 4 April 1959 Senegal and the French Sudan merged to form the Mali Federation, which became fully independent on 20 June 1960. 
The Federation broke up on 20 August 1960, when Senegal and French Sudan (renamed the Republic of Mali) each proclaimed independence.

Sudan

Senators for the French Sudan (now Mali) under the French Fourth Republic were:

On 4 April 1959 Senegal and the French Sudan merged to form the Mali Federation, which became fully independent on 20 June 1960. 
The Federation broke up on 20 August 1960, when Senegal and French Sudan (renamed the Republic of Mali) each proclaimed independence.

Togo

Senators for French Togoland under the French Fourth Republic were:

French Togoland became an autonomous republic within the French union in 1955.
On 27 April 1960 Togo became fully independent.

Upper Volta

Senators for French Upper Volta (now Burkina Faso) under the French Fourth Republic were:

Upper Volta became an autonomous republic in the French community on 11 December 1958.
The country became fully independent on 5 August 1960.

References

Sources

 
Lists of members of the Senate (France) by department